General Hawley may refer to:

Alan Hawley (British Army officer) (fl. 1970s–2000s), British Army major general
Henry Hawley (1685–1759), British Army lieutenant general
Joseph Roswell Hawley (1826–1905), Union Army brigadier general and brevet major general
Paul Ramsey Hawley (1891–1965), U.S. Army major general
Richard E. Hawley (born 1942), U.S. Air Force general